The 1977 South Dakota Coyotes football team represented the University of South Dakota in the 1977 NCAA Division II football season as a member of the North Central Conference (NCC). Led by third-year coach Beanie Cooper, the Coyotes compiled an overall record of 4–7 and a mark of 2–4–1 in conference play, tying for sixth place in the NCC. The team played two games against  in order to save money on travel; each game counted as a half-game in the conference standings.

Running back Mike Maguire rushed for 271 yards in the Coyotes' November 12 game against Nebraska–Omaha, breaking both the school's single-game rushing record of 220 yards and the NCC record of 257 yards. The Associated Press named Maguire one of their two NCC players of the week for his performance. Maguire and linebacker Matt Kiger were selected as the team's captains prior to the season.

Five South Dakota players were selected as first-team players on the 1977 All-North Central Conference football team: Maguire at running back; Mike Lee at offensive guard; Kiger at linebacker; Clyde McCormick at cornerback; and Dave Schwab as a defensive lineman.

Before the season
South Dakota finished the 1976 season with a record of four wins, five losses, and one tie (4–5–1, 3–2–1 in NCC play). Quarterbacks Scott Pollock and Steve Winkel had competed for the starting role in that season, and both returned to the team in 1977; three other quarterbacks, Tim Cooper, Eddie Miller, and Jay Monfore, also joined the team during the offseason. Pollock was ultimately chosen to start in the team's first game against Nebraska–Omaha.

Schedule

Game summaries

at Nebraska–Omaha

    
    
    
    
    
    

The game drew a record crowd of 10,000 to Al F. Caniglia Field in Omaha, Nebraska. Nebraska-Omaha took a 9–0 lead at halftime on a touchdown run by Bobby Bass and a safety. South Dakota came back with 16 unanswered points in the third and fourth quarters to take a 16–9 lead. South Dakota running back Mike Maguire, who totaled 155 rushing yards in the game, scored two touchdowns in the final five minutes of the game. His second touchdown came on an 82-yard run with 2:49 remaining. Nebraska then drove down the field for a touchdown and successfully converted a two-point conversion with 1:31 remaining.

Morningside

    
    
    
    
    
    

Morningside led, 7–3, at halftime, but the Coyotes outscored Morningside, 21–3, in the second half. Quarterback Steve Winkel led the comeback with key passes, and running back Mike Maguire ran for a total of 146 yards on 16 carries, including a school-record 89-yard touchdown in the third quarter. The victory was the 100th of Beanie Cooper's head coaching career. Linebacker Dave Combs recorded 17 tackles for the Coyotes.

at Northern Colorado

    
    
    
    
    

The Coyotes led, 10-3, at halftime following a 48-yard field goal from Knud Nielsen and a 13-yard touchdown pass from Steve Winkel to Jerry Biezuns. The Coyotes were unable to score in the second half while Northern Colorado scored 10 points in the fourth quarter. Late in the third quarter, Mike Maguire fumbled a punt, giving Northern Colorado possession at the Coyotes' 28-yard line. A personal foul penalty advanced the ball to the 14, and Jim Goodenberger ran for the tying touchdown. Late in the game, Northern Colorado converted a fourth-and-six play to advance the ball to the Coyotes' 27-yard line. With six seconds remaining in the game, Dale Stone kicked the game-winning field goal. South Dakota out-gained Northern Colorado by 257 yards to 178, but the Coyotes turned the ball over six times.

at Northeast Missouri State

    
    
    
    

On September 24, South Dakota lost a road game against , falling by a 19–7 score in Kirksville, Missouri. Due to injuries, the Coyotes played the game without the team's star running back Mike Maguire (twisted knee) and without starting quarterback Steve Winkel (broken hand). Coach Cooper's son, Tim Cooper, took over at quarterback and fumbled in the first quarter, leading to Northeast Missouri State's first touchdown. Northeast Missouri running back rushed for 184 yards on 25 carries. Northeast Missouri State out-gained the Coyotes by 367 yards to 202.

North Dakota

    
    
    

North Dakota scored two touchdowns in the second quarter and one in the fourth. Two of the touchdowns came after the defense intercepted Coyote passes. In all, North Dakota's defense tallied four interceptions and recovered three of six South Dakota fumbles. South Dakota had a touchdown erased due to a penalty and also missed a field goal.

at Western Illinois

    
    
    
    
    
    

The Coyotes trailed, 16–10, at halftime. 
After a scoreless third quarter, the Coyotes drove 80 yards beginning with 5:35 remaining in the game. Kevin Cusick scored on a one-yard run, and Knud Nielsen's extra point gave South Dakota the led with 56 seconds remaining. The Coyotes rushed for 274 yards, led by Mike Maguire with 120 yards and Scott Pollock with 87 yards. Western Illinois quarterback completed 7 of 23 passes for 178 yards. The victory snapped South Dakota's four-game losing streak.

at South Dakota State

    
    
    
    
    

The game was played before a crowd of 15,193 at Coughlin–Alumni Stadium in Brookings, South Dakota. South Dakota State took an early lead when Gary Maffett ran 81 yards for a touchdown in the first quarter. The Coyotes came from behind, scoring touchdowns in the second and third quarters and kicking a field goal in the fourth quarter. Mike Maguire rushed for 112 yards on 30 carries, while Kevin Cusick and Scott Pollock added 70 and 65 rushing yards, respectively.

at North Dakota State

    
    
    
    

On October 29, South Dakota lost to the North Dakota State Bison by a 9–6 score. Despite the loss, the Coyotes' defense held the Bison to 159 rushing yards (half of their season average) and nine points (24 points lower than their season average).

Nebraska–Omaha

    
    
    
    
    
    
    

On November 12, South Dakota closed its 1977 season with a 35–14 victory over Nebraska–Omaha at Inman Field in Vermillion. It was the second game of the season between the two schools. South Dakota rushed for 399 rushing yards while holding Nebraska–Omaha to only 31 rushing yards. Running back Mike Maguire led the attack and set school and NCC records with 271 rushing yards on 37 carries. He concluded the season with 983 rushing yards in nine games, having missed two games with a knee injury. Defensive back Bill Moats intercepted a pass and also threw a 13-yard touchdown pass on a fake field goal. Moats was also the team's punter and broke the school's season record with an average of 42.1 yards per punt.

Roster

References 

South Dakota
South Dakota Coyotes football seasons
South Dakota Coyotes football